Dr. Pierre-Yves Oudeyer is Research Director at the French Institute for Research in Computer Science and Automation (Inria) and head of the Inria and Ensta-ParisTech FLOWERS team. Before, he has been a permanent researcher in Sony Computer Science Laboratory for 8 years (1999-2007). He studied theoretical computer science at Ecole Normale Supérieure in Lyon, and received his Ph.D. degree in artificial intelligence from the University Paris VI, France. After working on computational models of language evolution, he is now working on developmental and social robotics, focusing on sensorimotor development, language acquisition and lifelong learning in robots. Strongly inspired by infant development, the mechanisms he studies include artificial curiosity, intrinsic motivation, the role of morphology in learning motor control, human-robot interfaces, joint attention and joint intentional understanding, and imitation learning. He has published a book, more than 80 papers in international journals and conferences, holds 8 patents, gave several invited keynote lectures in international conferences, and received several prizes for his work in developmental robotics and on the origins of language. In particular, he is laureate of the ERC Starting Grant EXPLORERS. He is editor of the IEEE CIS Newsletter on Autonomous Mental Development, and associate editor of IEEE Transactions on Autonomous Mental Development, Frontiers in Neurorobotics, and of the International Journal of Social Robotics. He is also working actively for the diffusion of science towards the general public, through the writing of popular science articles and participation to radio and TV programs as well as science exhibitions.

Oudeyer is inventor or co-inventor of over 15 patents covering 5 different technological issues. He received a number of awards for his thesis and certain publications.

References

External links
 
 http://flowers.inria.fr

1970 births
French roboticists
Artificial intelligence researchers
French computer scientists
French cognitive scientists
Researchers of artificial life
Living people
École Normale Supérieure alumni
21st-century French scientists